Qorqoruk-e Olya (also Romanized as Qorqorūk-e ‘Olyā, Qarqorūk-e ‘Olyā, and Qarqorūk ‘Olyā; also known as Qorqorūk-e Bālā) is a village in Abravan Rural District, Razaviyeh District, Mashhad County, Razavi Khorasan Province, Iran. At the 2006 census, its population was 63, in 13 families.

References 

Populated places in Mashhad County